Kenneth "Spider" Sinnaeve (born May 2, 1955) is a Canadian musician. He was a founding member of the popular Canadian band Streetheart, and since 2001 has been a member of Loverboy, replacing late original bassist Scott Smith. Sinnaeve has also contributed to many albums and played live performances with  George McCrae, Helix, Tom Cochrane & Red Rider, Kim Mitchell, The Partland Brothers, Lee Aaron, and The Guess Who. He is known for his extended solos, which often last 15–20 minutes.

Career
Sinnaeve and keyboardist Daryl Gutheil formed a band, Witness Inc, in Regina.
 The pair moved to Winnipeg and joined with Kenny Shields, calling themselves Wascana; in 1977 the group became a full band, Streetheart, with the addition of guitarist Paul Dean and drummer Matt Frenette. Streetheart released a number of successful albums in the 1980s.

Streetheart's most popular single, their 1979 disco-hybrid cover version of "Under My Thumb" by the Rolling Stones, achieved gold single status in Canada; the live version contains a blazing bass solo, performed by Sinnaeve.

After Streetheart broke up in 1983, Sinnaeve performed with the Partland Brothers and Red Rider. in 1988 he toured in western Canada with former bandmate Kenny Shields.

In 2001 Sinnaeve joined Loverboy, after the band's original bassist died in an accident. He has continued to play with this band for many years.

Awards
Awards include several Juno Awards, an Ampex Golden Reel, and a Technics All Star Band award as bass player of the year.  He has been inducted into the Western Canadian Music Hall of Fame twice, as well as the Juno Hall of Fame.

Personal life
Sinnaeve has a wife, Barbara, a daughter Kaari and a son, Anders.

Discography

with Streetheart
 Meanwhile Back in Paris... (1978)
 Under Heaven Over Hell (1979)
 Quicksand Shoes (1980)
 Drugstore Dancer (1980)
 Streetheart (1982)
 Dancing with Danger (1983)
 Buried Treasure (1984)

with Strange Advance
 2WO (1985)

with Loverboy
 Just Getting Started (2007)
 Rock 'n' Roll Revival (2012)
 Unfinished Business (2014)

References

External links 
 

Living people
Canadian rock bass guitarists
Loverboy members
Red Rider members
1955 births
20th-century Canadian bass guitarists
21st-century Canadian bass guitarists
Musicians from Regina, Saskatchewan